In mathematics, Nirenberg's conjecture, now Osserman's theorem, states that if a neighborhood of the sphere is omitted by the Gauss map of a complete minimal surface, then the surface in question is a plane. It was proved by Robert Osserman in 1959.

Original reference
Osserman, R (1959) . "Proof of a Conjecture of Nirenberg." Comm. Pure Appl. Math. 12, pp. 229–232.

References

External links
Weisstein, Eric W. "Nirenberg's Conjecture." From MathWorld–A Wolfram Web Resource.

Theorems in differential geometry
Conjectures that have been proved